The 2021–22 season was the 118th season in the existence of Royal Antwerp F.C. and the club's fifth consecutive season in the top flight of Belgian football. In addition to the domestic league, Antwerp participated in this season's editions of the Belgian Cup and the UEFA Europa League.

Players

First-team squad

Out on loan

Transfers

In

Out 

Notes

Pre-season and friendlies

Competitions

Overall record

First Division A

League table

Results summary

Results by round

Matches
The league fixtures were announced on 8 June 2021.

Play-Off I

Results summary

Results by round

Matches

Belgian Cup

UEFA Europa League

Play-off round
The draw for the play-off round was held on 2 August 2021.

Group stage

The group stage draw was held on 27 August 2021.

Statistics

Squad appearances and goals
Last updated on 3 October 2021.

|-
! colspan=12 style=background:#dcdcdc; text-align:center|Goalkeepers

|-
! colspan=12 style=background:#dcdcdc; text-align:center|Defenders

|-
! colspan=12 style=background:#dcdcdc; text-align:center|Midfielders

|-
! colspan=12 style=background:#dcdcdc; text-align:center|Forwards

|-
! colspan=12 style=background:#dcdcdc; text-align:center|Players who have made an appearance this season but have left the club
|}

Goalscorers

References

Royal Antwerp F.C. seasons
Antwerp
2021–22 UEFA Europa League participants seasons